Brett James Walsh (born February 19, 1994) is a Canadian male volleyball player. He was a member of the Canada men's national volleyball team at the 2016 FIVB Volleyball World League. He played U Sports volleyball for the Alberta Golden Bears where he won National Championships in 2014 and 2015 and was named the CIS Men's Volleyball Player of the Year in 2016.

References

1994 births
Living people
Alberta Golden Bears volleyball players
Canadian men's volleyball players
Sportspeople from Calgary